Hezhou railway station is a railway station in Pinggui District, Hezhou, Guangxi, China. The Guiyang-Guangzhou high-speed railway and the conventional-speed Luoyang–Zhanjiang railway serve this station.

History
The station opened to freight on 15 May 2009 and to passengers on 28 September.

The Guiyang-Guangzhou high-speed platforms were constructed adjacent to the existing station. High-speed service began in 2014.

In August 2017, reconstruction of the station building began. The new building was opened on 5 December 2018.

References

External links

Railway stations in China opened in 2009
Railway stations in Guangxi